A screen is a blocking move by an offensive player in which they stand beside or behind a defender in order to free a teammate to either shoot a pass or drive in to score. In basketball and field lacrosse, it is also known as a pick. Screens can be on-ball (when set for the ball-handler), or off-ball (when set for a teammate moving without the ball to get open for a pass). The two offensive players involved in setting the screen are known as the screener (who blocks the defender) and the cutter (who gets free from the defender).

Successfully "setting a screen" in team sports such as basketball and water polo requires attention to position and timing. An offensive player will first establish position so that his teammate can move toward him. The teammate changes pace and direction, and cuts (moves or dribbles quickly) very close to the screening player. The defender who is covering the cutter will have to push into the screening player, or divert around, losing a few steps. In basketball and lacrosse, the offensive player setting the pick must remain stationary at the moment of contact with the defender, and allow the defensive player a "reasonable opportunity" to avoid the screen; a screen is illegal if the screener moves in order to make contact, and obtains an advantage; the result is an offensive foul in basketball and a technical foul in lacrosse. There must be illegal contact for a moving screen to be a foul; no illegal contact, no foul, no matter how much moving the screener does. If the screener holds, leans or moves into the defender to cause contact, this will result in a foul on the screener.

After setting the screen, the screener is often open to roll to the basket and receive a pass. This tactic is called pick and roll in basketball. Another basketball tactic, called the pick and pop, is for the ballhandler to drive to the basket while the screener squares for a jumpshot.

Defensive moves to defeat a screen include sliding by the pick if the screening player leaves space, fighting over the screen (pushing the screener away, where allowed—this is not allowed in basketball), if the defender is strong enough, or switching defensive assignments with another defender, who can pick up the cutter on the other side of the screen.

In the team sport Ultimate setting a screen is not allowed. The screened player can call "pick", whereupon the play stops with all other players holding their current positions. The screened player can now catch up to the offensive player he or she was defending, then play continues.

See also 
 Screen pass
 Pick and roll
 Basketball techniques
 Glossary of basketball terms
 Glossary of water polo

References

External links 
 NBA Video Rulebook: Illegal Screen: Pick & Roll

Basketball penalties
Basketball terminology
Sports penalties